"Time of Our Lives/Connected" is a double A-side single written and released by Paul van Dyk.  The (A) song "Time of Our Lives" was recorded in collaboration with the indie UK rock band Vega 4. "Time of Our Lives" was featured in a Jeep commercial in May, 2007 and in the film The Sisterhood of the Traveling Pants. The (AA) song "Connected" was featured in a Motorola commercial featuring Paul. This song also featured in the movie Into the Blue.

Track listing

CD Version
Radio Edit
PVD Club Mix
Motomix 05
"Time of Our Lives" (Enhanced Video)

12" Version
A1 Time of Our Lives (PVD's Club Mix) 7:50
B1 Connected (Motomix_05) 7:15
B2 Connected (Marco V Mix) 8:46

CD: Mute / MUSDJ 155-2 (US) 
Time Of Our Lives (Pop Radio Mix/The Swiss American Federation Remix) - (3:32)
Time Of Our Lives (Dance Radio USA Mix/PVD's Remix Edit) - (4:05)

Charts

References

External links

2003 singles
Paul van Dyk songs